Permanent Resident Card or PR Card may refer to:

Canada permanent resident card
Chinese Foreign Permanent Resident ID Card
Hong Kong permanent resident identity card
Macau SAR permanent resident identity card
United States Permanent Resident Card